Farnley Tyas is a small village in West Yorkshire, England  south east of Huddersfield. It is located on a hilltop between Almondbury, Castle Hill, Thurstonland and Honley. It is mostly rural and farmland with private housing and some local authority social housing.

It has a public house, the Golden Cock Inn, a First School catering for around 50 children, aged from four to ten years old, a bowling club, a small sports field and the Church of St Lucius. It is part of the Parish of Almondbury with Farnley Tyas

History
Farnley Tyas urban district was a Township in 1894. First mentioned in the Domesday Book of 1086, it was then called Fereleia. Tyas is a family name from the le Tyeis who held land in the neighbourhood from the 13th century.

Extract from Pigot & Co's National Commercial Directory, 1834
FARNLEY TYAS is a township, in the same parish as Honley and Crossland, about three miles from Huddersfield and two from Honley. There are but few manufacturing establishments in this township, and, divested of these, it is a place of little importance.  The Earl of Dartmouth contributes £30 annually for the support of a school, in which thirty children are instructed.  The population of this township has latterly declined: in 1821 it contained 900 inhabitants, and in 1831, 849.

In 1925 it was merged with Thurstonland urban district. Farnley Tyas and Thurstonland Urban District was then abolished in 1938 under a County Review Order, with the majority of the district merging into the Kirkburton urban district and the remainder into the Holmfirth urban district. Although within the Kirklees district of Huddersfield recent boundary changes will transfer the village from the Westminster Parliamentary district of Wakefield to  Barnsley

Events
The Honley Agricultural Show, which is held every June, has used farmland alongside Moor Lane as venues for recent shows.

See also
Listed buildings in Kirkburton

References

External links

Farnley Tyas Community Website
Honley Agricultural Show Official Website

Villages in West Yorkshire
Kirkburton